North Bethesda station is a rapid transit station on the Red Line of the Washington Metro in North Bethesda, Maryland. The North Bethesda station was opened on December 15, 1984, as White Flint and is operated by the Washington Metropolitan Area Transit Authority (WMATA). Providing service for the Red Line, the station serves residential and commercial areas of North Bethesda and Rockville and is located near the former White Flint Mall and the new Pike & Rose mixed-use development.

Location
North Bethesda station serves commercial and residential areas of North Bethesda and Rockville. The station entrance is located immediately adjacent to the headquarters of the Nuclear Regulatory Commission. The large Pike & Rose mixed-use development sits one block north of the station.

Transit-oriented development
North Bethesda station is at the center of the Pike District (formerly White Flint) planning area which was the subject of two sector plans (in 2010 and 2018) that were intended to generate dense, transit-oriented development. The sector plans prescribed new zoning to allow taller buildings to be built closer to the Metro station along with a new street grid to link disjointed areas.

History
White Flint was originally known as Nicholson Lane in planning documents, but the station was renamed after the White Flint Mall before it opened. A pylon at Farragut North still bears the original name of the station; extensions were originally printed on pylons throughout the system and covered up until they opened.

On December 9, 2021, the Metro board voted to change the name of the station from White Flint to North Bethesda. The new name was added to Metro system maps when the second phase of the Silver Line opened on November 15, 2022. In June 2022, signage in the station began to be modified to reflect the name change. The new name change became official on September 11, 2022.

Station layout
North Bethesda Station has an island platform located just below street level in an open cut, which leads to a tunnel on either side of the station. Access to the station is provided at ground level at the northeast corner of Rockville Pike and Marinelli Road, with a Metro-style underpass providing access to the northwest corner of the intersection. A parking garage is located east of the station on Marinelli Road.

Notable places nearby 
 Nuclear Regulatory Commission
 Kennedy Shriver Aquatic Center 
 Westfield Montgomery Mall is accessible via Ride On 26 or 42 bus.
 Pike & Rose

References

External links

 The Schumin Web Transit Center: White Flint Station
 Marinelli Road entrance from Google Maps Street View

North Bethesda, Maryland
Stations on the Red Line (Washington Metro)
Railway stations in Montgomery County, Maryland
Washington Metro stations in Maryland
Railway stations in the United States opened in 1984
1984 establishments in Maryland